François Legrand (born March 26, 1970) is a French professional sport climber known for winning five Lead Climbing World Cups (1990, 1991, 1992, 1993, 1997), and three consecutive Lead Climbing World Championships (1991, 1993, 1995). As of 2022, no other climber has been able to match this achievement in IFSC lead climbing, and as of the end of 2022, Legrand had won the third most IFSC gold medals of any competitive climber in history.

Climbing career 
Son of a mountain guide, he spent a lot of time on mountains since he was a boy. His parents wanted him to become a mountain guide, rather than a sport climber. However, in 1988, aged 18, he ran away and moved for some months in a cave in Buoux. In the same year, he began competing at a national level. In 1990, he moved to Aix-en-Provence, where he rented an apartment with his friend Yuji Hirayama.

In 1990, aged 20, he won his first Lead Climbing World Cups.  During his career in competition climbing, which ended in 2003, Legrand won five Lead Climbing World Cups (1990, 1991, 1992, 1993, 1997), three consecutive Lead Climbing World Championships (1991, 1993, 1995) and four Rock Masters. As of 2022, no other climber was ever able to match this achievement. The second-ranking for the number of awarded Lead Climbing World Cups is Alexandre Chabot, who won three consecutive times (2001, 2002, 2003).

Since 2009, he is the coach for the French national youth team together with Rémi Samyn.

Rankings

Climbing World Cup

Climbing World Championships

Number of medals in the Climbing World Cup

Lead

Notable ascents

Redpointed routes 
:
 Robi in the Sky - Calanques (FRA) - 2000 - First ascent

:
 Necessary Evil - Virgin River Gorge (USA) - Fifth ascent in 2002 - Route bolted by Chris Sharma in 1997
 Getto Booty - Mount Charleston (USA) - 2000 - First ascent
 Hasta La Vista - Mount Charleston (USA)
 Le Bronx - Orgon (FRA)
 La Connexion - Orgon (FRA)
 Reini's Vibe - Massone (ITA)
 Claudio Cafè - Terra Promessa (ITA)

:
 Le Plafond - Volx (FRA) - His first 8c
 Maginot Line - Volx (FRA)
 Macumba Club - Orgon (FRA)
 Injustice - Orgon (FRA)
 U.F.O. - Calanques (FRA)
 Pterodactile - Tolone (FRA)
 Moutchiki - Luberon (FRA)
 Facile - Mount Charleston (USA)

See also
List of grade milestones in rock climbing
History of rock climbing
Rankings of most career IFSC gold medals

References

External links 

French rock climbers
1970 births
Living people
Sportspeople from Grenoble
IFSC Climbing World Championships medalists
IFSC Climbing World Cup overall medalists